B11, B.XI or B-11 may refer to:

Transportation
 B11 (New York City bus) serving Brooklyn
 Bundesstraße 11, federal highway in Germany

Vehicles
 HMS B11, a B-class submarine of the British Royal Navy
 Bavarian B XI, an 1895 German steam locomotive model
 Bensen B-11, a Bensen Aircraft model
 Douglas YB-11, a bomber designed for the United States Army Air Corps
 Nissan B11, a version of the Nissan Sunny
 Volvo B11R, a coach bus chassis manufactured by Volvo since 2011

Other uses
 B-11 recoilless rifle, a Soviet 107 mm weapon
 Gareth Bale, a professional footballer from Wales
 Boron-11 (B-11 or 11B), an isotope of boron
 Caro-Kann Defence, Encyclopaedia of Chess Openings code B11

See also

 
 
 
 
 
11B (disambiguation)
B1 (disambiguation)
BII (disambiguation)
BLL (disambiguation)
BXI (disambiguation)